Jaffa, in Hebrew Yafo and in Arabic Yafa and also called Japho or Joppa, the southern and oldest part of Tel Aviv-Yafo, is an ancient port city in Israel. Jaffa is known for its association with the biblical stories of Jonah, Solomon and Saint Peter as well as the mythological story of Andromeda and Perseus, and later for its oranges.

Today, Jaffa is one of Israel's mixed cities, with approximately 37% of the city being Arab.

Etymology
The town was mentioned in Egyptian sources and the Amarna letters as Yapu. Mythology says that it is named for Yafet (Japheth), one of the sons of Noah, the one who built it after the Flood. The Hellenist tradition links the name to Iopeia, or Cassiopeia, mother of Andromeda. An outcropping of rocks near the harbor is reputed to have been the place where Andromeda was rescued by Perseus. Pliny the Elder associated the name with Iopa, daughter of Aeolus, god of the wind. The medieval Arab geographer al-Muqaddasi referred to it as Yaffa.

History

The tell of Jaffa, created through the accumulation of debris and landfill over the centuries, made the hill even higher.

Middle Bronze Age
The city as such was established at the latest around 1800 BCE.

Late Bronze Age
Jaffa is mentioned in an Ancient Egyptian letter from 1440 BCE. The so-called story of the Taking of Joppa glorifies its conquest by Pharaoh Thutmose III, whose general, Djehuty, hid Egyptian soldiers in sacks carried by pack animals and sent them camouflaged as tribute into the Canaanite city, where the soldiers emerged and conquered it. The story predates the story of the Trojan horse, as told by Homer, by at least two centuries.

The city is also mentioned in the Amarna letters under its Egyptian name Ya-Pho (Ya-Pu, EA 296, l.33). The city was under Egyptian rule until around 800 BCE.

Hebrew Bible: conquest to return from Babylon
In the Hebrew Bible, Jaffa is depicted as the northernmost Philistine city, bordering the Israelite territories – more specifically those of Tribe of Dan (hence the modern term "Gush Dan" for the center of the coastal plain). The Israelites did not manage to take Jaffa from the Philistines.

Jaffa is mentioned four times in the Hebrew Bible: as the northernmost Philistine city by the coast, bordering the territory of the Tribe of Dan; as port-of-entry for the cedars of Lebanon for Solomon's Temple; as the place whence the prophet Jonah embarked for Tarshish; and again as port-of-entry for the cedars of Lebanon for the Second Temple of Jerusalem.

Assyrian, Babylonian and Persian periods
In the late VIII century BC, Sennacherib, king of Assyria, recorded conquering Jaffa from its sovereign, the Philistine king of Ashkelon.

After a period of Babylonian occupation, under Persian rule, Jaffa was governed by Phoenicians from Tyre.

Hellenistic to Byzantine periods
Alexander the Great's troops were stationed in Jaffa. It later became a port city of the Seleucid Empire until it was taken over by the Maccabees around 143 BCE, and was ruled by the Hasmonean dynasty. Strabo, writing in the early first century CE, describes Joppa as a location from which it is possible to see Jerusalem, the capital of the Jews, and writes that the Jews used it as their naval arsenal when they descended to the sea. According to Josephus, however, the harbor at Jaffa was inferior to that of Caesarea.

During the First Jewish–Roman War, Jaffa was captured and burned by Cestius Gallus. The Roman Jewish historian Josephus (Jewish War 2.507–509, 3:414–426) writes that 8,400 inhabitants were massacred. Pirates operating from the rebuilt port incurred the wrath of Vespasian, who razed the city and erected a citadel in its place, installing a Roman garrison there.

The New Testament account of Saint Peter bringing back to life the widow Dorcas (recorded in Acts of the Apostles, takes place in Jaffa, then called in Greek  (Latinized as Joppa).  relates that, while Peter was in Jaffa, he had a vision of a large sheet filled with "clean" and "unclean" animals being lowered from heaven, together with a message from the Holy Spirit telling him to accompany several messengers to Cornelius in Caesarea Maritima.

In Midrash Tanna'im in its chapter , reference is made to Jose ben Halafta (2nd century) traveling through Jaffa. Jaffa seems to have attracted serious Jewish scholars in the 4th and 5th century. The Jerusalem Talmud (compiled 4th and 5th century) in Moed Ketan references Rabi Akha bar Khanina of Jaffa; and in Pesachim chapter 1 refers to Rabi Pinchas ben Yair of Jaffa. The Babylonian Talmud (compiled 5th century) in Megillah 16b mentions Rav Adda Demin of Jaffa. Leviticus Rabbah (compiled between 5th and 7th century) mentions Rav Nachman of Jaffa. The Pesikta Rabbati (written in the 9th century) in chapter 17 mentions R. Tanchum of Jaffa. Several streets and alleys of the Jaffa Flea Market area are named after these scholars.

During the first centuries of Christianity, Jaffa was a fairly unimportant Roman and Byzantine locality, which only in the 5th century became a bishopric. A very small number of its Greek or Latin bishops are known.

Early Islamic period

In 636 Jaffa was conquered by Arabs. Under Islamic rule, it served as a port of Ramla, then the provincial capital.

Al-Muqaddasi (c. 945/946 – 991) described Yafah as "lying on the sea, is but a small town, although the emporium of Palestine and the port of Ar-Ramlah. It is protected by a strong wall with iron gates, and the sea-gates also are of iron. The mosque is pleasant to the eye, and overlooks the sea. The harbour is excellent".

Crusader/Ayyubid period
Jaffa was captured in June 1099 during the First Crusade, and was the centre of the County of Jaffa and Ascalon, one of the vassals of the Kingdom of Jerusalem. One of its counts, John of Ibelin, wrote the principal book of the Assizes of the Kingdom of Jerusalem.

Saladin conquered Jaffa in 1187. The city surrendered to King Richard the Lionheart on 10 September 1191, three days after the Battle of Arsuf. Despite efforts by Saladin to reoccupy the city in the July 1192 Battle of Jaffa, the city remained in the hands of the Crusaders. On 2 September 1192, the Treaty of Jaffa was formally signed, guaranteeing a three-year truce between the two armies.

In 1229, Frederick II signed a ten-year truce in a new Treaty of Jaffa. He fortified the castle of Jaffa and had two inscriptions carved into city wall, one Latin and the other Arabic. The inscription, deciphered in 2011, describes him as the "Holy Roman Emperor" and bears the date "1229 of the Incarnation of our Lord Jesus the Messiah."

Mamluk period
In March 1268, Baibars, the sultan of the Egyptian Mamluks, conquered Jaffa simultaneously with conquering Antioch. Baibars's goal was to conquer Christian crusader strongholds. An inscription from the White Mosque of Ramla, today visible in the Great Mosque of Gaza, commemorates the event:In the name of God the Merciful, the Compassionate,...gave power to his servant...who has trust in him...who fights for Him and defends the faith of His Prophet...Sultan of Islam and the Muslims, Baybars...who came out with his victorious army on the 10th of the month of Rajab from the land of Egypt, resolved to carry out jihad and combat the intransigent infidels. He camped in the port city of Jaffa in the morning and conquered it, by God's will, in the third hour of that day. Then he ordered the erection of the dome over the blessed minaret, as well as the gate of this mosque...in the year 666 of the Hijra [1268 CE]. May God have mercy upon him and upon all Muslims.Abu'l-Fida (1273–1331), writing in 1321, described "Yafa, in Filastin" as "a small but very pleasant town lying on the sea-shore. It has a celebrated harbour. The town of Yafa is well fortified. Its markets are much frequented, and many merchants ply their trades here. There is a large harbour frequented by all the ships coming to Filastin, and from it they set sail to all lands. Between it and Ar Ramlah the distance is 6 miles, and it lies west of Ar Ramlah."

Ottoman period

In 1515, Jaffa was conquered by the Ottoman sultan Selim I.

In the census of 1596, it appeared located in the nahiya of Ramla in the liwa of Gaza. It had a population of 15 households, all Muslim. They paid a fixed tax rate of 33,3 % on various products; a total of 7,520 akçe.

The traveller Jean Cotwyk (Cotovicus) described Jaffa as a heap of ruins when he visited in 1598. Botanist and traveller Leonhard Rauwolf landed near the site of the town on 13 September 1575 and wrote "we landed on the high, rocky shore where the town of Joppe did stand formerly, at this time the town was so demolished that there was not one house to be found." (p. 212, Rauwolf, 1582)

The 17th century saw the beginning of the re-establishment of churches and hostels for Christian pilgrims en route to Jerusalem and the Galilee. During the 18th century, the coastline around Jaffa was often besieged by pirates and this led to the inhabitants relocating to Ramla and Lod, where they relied on messages from a solitary guard house to inform them when ships were approaching the harbour. The landing of goods and passengers was notoriously difficult and dangerous. Until well into the 20th century, ships had to rely on teams of oarsmen to bring their cargo ashore.

On 7 March 1799, Napoleon captured the town in what became known as the Siege of Jaffa, ransacked it, and killed scores of local inhabitants as a reaction to his envoys being brutally killed when delivering an ultimatum of surrender. Napoleon ordered the massacre of thousands of Muslim soldiers who were imprisoned having surrendered to the French. Napoleon's deputy commissioner of war Jacques-François Miot described it thus:

Many more died in an epidemic of bubonic plague that broke out soon afterwards. The governor who was appointed after these devastating events, Muhammad Abu-Nabbut, commenced wide-ranging building and restoration work in Jaffa, including the Mahmoudiya Mosque and Sabil Abu Nabbut. During the 1834 Peasants' revolt in Palestine, Jaffa was besieged for forty days by "mountaineers" in revolt against Ibrahim Pasha of Egypt.

Residential life in the city was reestablished in the early 19th century. In 1820, Isaiah Ajiman of Istanbul built a synagogue and hostel for the accommodation of Jews on their way to the holy cities of Jerusalem, Hebron, Tiberias and Safed. This area became known as Dar al-Yehud (Arabic for "the house of the Jews"); and was the basis of the Jewish community in Jaffa. The appointment of Mahmud Aja as Ottoman governor marked the beginning of a period of stability and growth for the city, interrupted by the 1832 conquest of the city by Muhammad Ali of Egypt.

By 1839, at least 153 Sephardi Jews were living in Jaffa. The community was served for fifty years by Rabbi Yehuda HaLevi miRagusa. In the early 1850s, HaLevi leased an orchard to Clorinda S. Minor, founder of a Christian messianic community that established Mount Hope, a farming initiative to encourage local Jews to learn manual trades, which the Messianics did in order to pave wave for the Second Coming of Jesus. In 1855, the British Jewish philanthropist Moses Montefiore bought the orchard from HaLevi, although Minor continued to manage it.

American missionary Ellen Clare Miller, visiting Jaffa in 1867, reported that the town had a population of "about 5000, 1000 of these being Christians, 800 Jews and the rest Moslems". The city walls were torn down during the 1870s, allowing the city to expand.

By the beginning of the 20th century, the population of Jaffa had swelled considerably. A group of Jews left Jaffa for the sand dunes to the north, where in 1909 they held a lottery to divide the lots acquired earlier. The settlement was known at first as Ahuzat Bayit (Hebrew: אחוזת בית), but an assembly of its residents changed its name to Tel Aviv on 21 May 1910. Other Jewish suburbs to Jaffa were founded at about the same time. In 1904, rabbi Abraham Isaac Kook (1864–1935) moved to Ottoman Palestine and took up the position of Chief Rabbi of Jaffa. In 1917, the Tel Aviv and Jaffa deportation resulted in the Ottomans expelling the entire civilian population. While Muslim evacuees were allowed to return before long, the Jewish evacuees remained in camps (and some in Egypt) until after the British conquest.

During the course of their campaign through Ottoman Palestine and the Sinai against the Ottomans, the British took Jaffa in November 1917 although it remained under observation and fire from the Ottomans. The battle of Jaffa in late December 1917 pushed back the Ottoman forces securing Jaffa and the line of communication between it and Jerusalem (which had been taken on 11 December in the Battle of Jerusalem).

British Mandate

According to the 1922 census of Palestine conducted by the British Mandate authorities, Jaffa had a population of 47,799, consisting of 20,699 Muslims, 20,152 Jews and 6,850 Christians, increasing to 51,866 in the 1931 census, residing in 11,304 houses.

During the British Mandate, tension between the Jewish and Arab population increased. A wave of Arab attacks during 1920 and 1921 caused many Jewish residents to flee and resettle in Tel Aviv, initially a marginal Jewish neighborhood north of Jaffa. The Jaffa riots in 1921, (known in Hebrew as Meoraot Tarpa) began with a May Day parade that turned violent. Arab rioters attacked Jewish residents and buildings killing 47 Jews and wounding 146. The Hebrew author Yosef Haim Brenner was killed in the riots. At the end of 1922, Tel Aviv had 15,000 residents: by 1927, the population had risen to 38,000.

Still, during most of the 1920s Jaffa and Tel Aviv maintained peaceful co-existence. Most Jewish businesses were located in Jaffa, some Jewish neighbourhoods paid taxes to the municipality of Jaffa, many young Jews who could not afford the housing costs of Tel Aviv resided there, and the big neighbourhood of Menashiya was by and large fully mixed. The first electric company in the British Mandate of Palestine, although owned by Jewish shareholders, had been named the Jaffa Electric Company. In 1923, both Jaffa and Tel Aviv had begun a rapid process of wired electrification through a joint grid.

The 1936–39 Arab revolt in British Palestine inflicted great economic and infrastructural damage on Jaffa. It began on 19 April 1936 with a riot which ended with 9 Jews killed and scores injured. The Arab leadership declared a general strike, which began in the Jaffa Port, a place that had already become a symbol of Arab resistance. Military reinforcements were brought in from Malta and Egypt to subdue the rioting which spread throughout the country. The Old City, with its maze of homes, winding alleyways and underground sewer system, provided an ideal escape route for the rioters fleeing the British army.

In May 1936, municipal services were cut off, the old city was barricaded, and access roads were covered with glass shards and nails. In June, British bombers dropped boxes of leaflets in Arabic requesting the inhabitants to evacuate that same day. On June 16, British Royal Engineers blew up from 220 to 240 Arab homes from east to west, leaving an open strip that cut through the heart of the city from end to end, leaving 6,000 Jaffa Palestinians destitute. On the evening of 17 June 1936, 1500 British soldiers entered Jaffa and a British warship sealed off escape routes by sea. On 29 June, security forces implemented another stage of the plan, carving a swath from north to south. The mandatory authorities claimed the operation was part of a "facelift" of the old city. Local Arab papers could only employ sarcasm in describing what had happened, speaking of the operation as one in which the British forces beautified the city by using boxes of dynamite. In June, 1936 the Palestine Chief Justice at the time,   Sir Michael McDonnell, found in favour of the Jaffa Arab petitioners and, upholding the existing laws regarding demolitions, ruled against the Army's destruction of the Arab old city. In response, the Colonial Office dismissed him from his post.

The report produced by the Peel Commission in 1937 recommended that Jaffa, together with Bethlehem, Jerusalem, Lydda and Ramle, remain under permanent mandatory control, forming a "corridor" from the sea port to the Holy Places, accessible to Arabs and Jews alike; whereas the rest of Mandatory Palestine was to be split between an Arab state and a Jewish state.

Village Statistics of 1945 listed Jaffa with a population of 94,310, of whom 50,880 were Muslims, 28,000 were Jews, 15,400 were Christians and 30 were classified as "other". The Christians were mostly Greek Orthodox and about one-sixth of them were members of the Eastern Catholic Churches. One of the most prominent members of the Arab Christian community was the Greek Orthodox Issa El-Issa, publisher of the newspaper Falastin.

In 1945, the Jewish community of Jaffa complained to the city mayor Yousef Haikal that their neighbourhoods don't receive appropriate municipal services (street lighting and paving, garbage removal, sewerage etc.) even though they contribute 40% of the municipality's budget. Some of the services (education, healthcare, and social services) had already been provided by Tel Aviv Municipality at its own expense, which formed the base for the Jewish community's demand that the Mandatory government annex their neighbourhoods to Tel Aviv. In the year of 1946, Tel Aviv Municipality spent £P 300K on services for the Jewish neighbourhoods of Jaffa, an increase from £P 80K in the year of 1942.

In 1947, the UN Special Commission on Palestine recommended that Jaffa be included in the planned Jewish state. Due to the large Arab majority, however, it was instead designated as an enclave of the Arab state in the 1947 United Nations Partition Plan for Palestine. The enclave would have excluded the northern Jewish-populated parts of the city, but included the agricultural lands to the south and east of the city, extending to then-boundaries of Mikveh Israel, Holon and Bat Yam.

Following the inter-communal violence which broke out following the passing of the UN partition resolution the mayors of Jaffa and Tel Aviv tried to calm their communities. One of the main concerns for the people of Jaffa was the protection of the citrus fruit export trade which had still not reached its pre-Second World War highs. Eventually the bilateral orange-picking and exporting of both sides continued although without a formal agreement.

At the beginning of 1948 Jaffa's defenders consisted of one company of around 400 men organised by the Muslim Brotherhood. As in Haifa, the irregulars intimidated the local population.

On 4 January 1948 the Lehi detonated a truck bomb outside the Saraya, formerly the Ottoman administrative building and now housing the Arab National Committee. The building and some nearby buildings were destroyed. Most of the 26 dead and many wounded were not connected to the National Committee but were passersby and staff at a food distribution program for poor children that was also in the same building. Most of the children were not present as it was Sunday.

In February Jaffa's Mayor, Yousef Haikal, contacted David Ben-Gurion through a British intermediary trying to secure a peace agreement with Tel Aviv, but the commander of the Arab militia in Jaffa opposed it.

On 25 April 1948, the Irgun launched an offensive on Jaffa. This began with a mortar bombardment which went on for three days during which twenty tons of high explosive were fired into the town. On 27 April the British Government, fearing a repetition of the mass exodus from Haifa the week before, ordered the British Army to confront the Irgun and their offensive ended. Simultaneously the Haganah had launched Operation Hametz, which overran the villages east of Jaffa and cut the town off from the interior.

The fall of Haifa a few days earlier, and fear of another massacre similar to Irgun's Deir Yassin massacre, caused panic across the Arabs of Jaffa, leading most of them to flee. The population of Jaffa on the eve of the attack was between 50,000 and 60,000, with some 20,000 people having already left the town. By 30 April, there were 15,000–25,000 remaining. In the following days a further 10,000–20,000 people fled by sea. When the Haganah took control of the town on 14 May around 4,000 people were left. The town and harbour's warehouses were extensively looted.

The city surrendered to the Haganah on 14 May 1948 and shortly after the British police and army left the city.
The 3,800 Arabs who remained in Jaffa after the exodus were concentrated in the Ajami district and subject to strict martial law. The military administration in Jaffa lasted until 1 June 1949, at which point, Tel Aviv Municipality took over the administration; Jaffa Municipality, de-jure still in existence at the time, had not exercised any authority since 1948 until its dissolution in 1950.

State of Israel

Gradual annexation into Tel Aviv

The boundaries of Tel Aviv and Jaffa became a matter of contention between the Tel Aviv municipality and the Israeli government during 1948. The former wished to incorporate only the well-off Jewish suburbs in the north of Jaffa, while the latter wanted a more complete unification. The issue also had international sensitivity, since the main part of Jaffa was in the Arab portion of the United Nations Partition Plan, whereas Tel Aviv was not, and no armistice agreements had yet been signed. An alternative proposal, merging Bat Yam and Holon into Jaffa to form a bigger city south of Tel Aviv, was rejected on financial grounds, as the two small Jewish settlements lacked the funds necessary to sustain Jaffa.

On 10 December 1948, the government announced the annexation to Tel Aviv of Jaffa's Jewish suburbs of Maccabi (American–German Colony), Volovelsky (northwestern Florentin), Giv'at Herzl, and Shapira; territories outside Jaffa's municipal boundary, specifically the Arab neighbourhood of Abu Kabir, the Arab village of Salama and some of its agricultural land, and the working class Jewish areas of Hatikva and Ezra, were annexed to Tel Aviv at the same time, thus introducing around 50,000 new residents into the city. On 18 May 1949, the new boundary was drawn along Shari' Es Salahi (now Olei Zion Street) and Shari' El Quds (now Ben-Zvi Road), thereby adding into Tel Aviv the former Arab neighbourhood of Manshiya and part of Jaffa city centre, for the first time including land that had been in the Arab portion of the UN partition plan.

The government decided on a permanent unification of Tel Aviv and Jaffa on 4 October 1949, but the actual unification was delayed until 16 June 1950 due to concerted opposition from Tel Aviv's mayor Israel Rokach, who had demanded government funding of 1M I£ towards the expenses of providing municipal services to Jaffa. Jaffa was expected to consume 18% of the unified municipality's budget, while contributing only 4% of its income. The two sides came to an agreement under which the government covered 100K I£ of the unified municipality's expenses, as well as funded healthcare, education, and social services for Jaffa residents directly from the state budget. The name of the unified city was Tel Aviv until 19 August 1950, when it was renamed as Tel Aviv–Yafo in order to preserve the historical name Jaffa. The population of Jaffa prior to the unification was estimated as 40,000, out of them 5,000 Arabs, and most of the others new olim.

The land which had formerly belonged to Jaffa municipality, and was annexed into Tel Aviv, includes the neighbourhoods of Manshiya, Florentin, Giv'at Herzl, and Shapira; and such landmarks as Charles Clore Park, Hassan Bek Mosque, Carmel Market, the former Jaffa railway station, and the new Tel Aviv central bus station. On the other hand, Jaffa boundaries were expanded to the southeast, incorporating Gaon Stadium and the new neighbourhoods of Neve Ofer, Jaffa Gimel and Jaffa Dalet. Other former Arab villages incorporated into Tel Aviv–Jaffa include Al-Mas'udiyya, annexed on 20 December 1942, in the New North; Jarisha, annexed on 25 November 1943, on the southern bank of Yarkon River; Al-Jammasin al-Gharbi, annexed on 31 March 1948, and since 1957 redeveloped into Bavli neighbourhood; and Al-Shaykh Muwannis, annexed on 25 February 1949, and since 1955 redeveloped into Tel Aviv University main campus.

Streets renamed
After the Jewish takeover, all pre-existing street names in Jaffa were abolished, and replaced with numeric identifiers. By 1954, only the four main streets had proper names: Jerusalem (former Djemal Pasha; then King George V; then No.1) Avenue; Tarshish (former Bustrus; then No.2; now David Raziel) Street; Eilat Street (former No.298); and Shalma Road (former No.310).

The road passing between Florentin and Neve Tzedek neighbourhoods was until 1948 named Tel Aviv Road, being the main thoroughfare between the two city centres. After the annexation of Florentin into Tel Aviv, it became an internal road in Tel Aviv, so its name no longer made sense. Thus the section lying within the new Tel Aviv boundaries was renamed into Jaffa Road; and the section which became the new Tel Aviv–Jaffa boundary, into Eilat Street.

However, both names remain in use.

Arabic street names were eventually replaced with Hebrew ones, e.g. Al-Kutub Street was renamed Resh Galuta Street, Abu Ubeyda Street was renamed She’erit Yisra’el Street, and Al-Salahi Street was renamed Olei Zion Street. This practice has been criticized by residents of affected Arabic neighborhoods, who deem the names inappropriate (for example, a street where the Al Siksik Mosque located was renamed Beit Eshel Street) and demand a return to Arabic names.

Urban development
From the 1990s onwards, efforts have been made to restore Arab and Islamic landmarks, such as the Mosque of the Sea and Hassan Bek Mosque, and document the history of Jaffa's Arab population.
Parts of the Old City have been renovated, turning Jaffa into a tourist attraction featuring old restored buildings, art galleries, theaters, souvenir shops, restaurants, sidewalk cafes and promenades. Many artists have moved their studios from Tel Aviv to the Old City and its surroundings, such as the Jaffa port, the American–Germany Colony and the flea market. Beyond the Old City and tourist sites, many neighborhoods of Jaffa are poor and underdeveloped. However, real-estate prices have risen sharply due to gentrification projects in Ajami, Noga, and Lev Yafo. The municipality of Tel Aviv–Yafo is currently working to beautify and modernize the port area.

Economy
In the 19th century, Jaffa was best known for its soap industry. Modern industry emerged in the late 1880s. The most successful enterprises were metalworking factories, among them the machine shop run by the Templers that employed over 100 workers in 1910. Other factories produced orange-crates, barrels, corks, noodles, ice, seltzer, candy, soap, olive oil, leather, alkali, wine, cosmetics and ink. Most of the newspapers and books printed in Ottoman Palestine were published in Jaffa.

In 1859, a Jewish visitor, L.A. Frankl, found sixty-five Jewish families living in Jaffa, 'about 400 soul in all.' Of these four were shoemakers, three tailors, one silversmith and one watchmaker. There were also merchants and shopkeepers and 'many live by manual labour, porters, sailors, messengers, etc.'

Until the mid-19th century, Jaffa's orange groves were mainly owned by Arabs, who employed traditional methods of farming. The pioneers of modern agriculture in Jaffa were American settlers, who brought in farm machinery in the 1850s and 1860s, followed by the Templers and the Jews. From the 1880s, real estate became an important branch of the economy. A 'biarah' (a watered garden) cost 100,000 piastres and annually produced 15,000, of which the farming costs were 5,000: 'A very fair percentage return on the investment.' Water for the gardens was easily accessible with wells between ten and forty feet deep.
Jaffa's citrus industry began to flourish in the last quarter of the 19th century. E.C. Miller records that 'about ten million' oranges were being exported annually, and that the town was surrounded by 'three or four hundred orange gardens, each containing upwards of one thousand trees'. Shamuti oranges were the major crop, but citrons, lemons and mandarin oranges were also grown. Jaffa had a reputation for producing the best pomegranates.

Demography

Modern Jaffa has a heterogeneous population of Jews, Christians, and Muslims. Jaffa currently has 46,000 residents, of whom 30,000 are Jews and 16,000 are Arabs. Tabeetha School in Jaffa was founded in 1863. It is owned by the Church of Scotland. The school provides education in English to children from Christian, Jewish and Muslim backgrounds.

Socioeconomic and political problems
Jaffa suffers from drug problems, high crime rates and violence. Some Arab residents have alleged that the Israeli authorities are attempting to Judaize Jaffa by evicting Arab residents from houses owned by the Amidar government-operated public housing company. Amidar representatives say the residents are illegal squatters.

Landmarks

Sights and museums

The Clock Square with its distinctive clocktower was built in 1906 in honor of Sultan Abdul Hamid II. The Saraya (governor's palace) was built in the 1890s. Andromeda rock is the rock to which beautiful Andromeda was chained in Greek mythology. The Zodiac alleys are a maze of restored alleys leading to the harbor. Jaffa Hill is a center for archaeological finds, including restored Egyptian gates, about 3,500 years old. Jaffa Lighthouse is an inactive lighthouse located in the old port.

The Jaffa Museum of Antiquities is located in an 18th-century Ottoman building constructed on the remains of a Crusader fortress. In 1811, Abu Nabout turned it into his seat of government. In the late 19th century, the governmental moved to the "New Saraya," and the building was sold to a wealthy Greek-Orthodox family who established a soap factory there. Since 1961, it has housed an archaeological museum, which is currently closed to the general public.

The Libyan Synagogue (Beit Zunana) was a synagogue built by a Jewish landlord, Zunana, in the 18th century. It was turned into a hotel and then a soap factory, and reopened as a synagogue for Libyan Jewish immigrants after 1948. In 1995, it became a museum.

Other museums and galleries in the area include the Farkash Gallery collection.

Churches and monasteries

The Greek Orthodox Monastery of Archangel Michael (Patriarchate of Jerusalem) near Jaffa Port also has Romanian and Russian communities in its compound. Built in 1894, the Church of St. Peter and St. Tabitha serves the Russian Orthodox Christian community, with services in Russian and Hebrew; underneath the chapel nearby there is what is believed to be the tomb of St Tabitha. St. Peter's Church is a Franciscan Roman-Catholic basilica and hospice built in 1654 on the remains of a Crusader fortress, and commemorates St Peter, as he brought the disciple Tabitha back from the dead; Napoleon is believed to have stayed there.

Immanuel Church, built 1904, serves today a Lutheran congregation with services in English and Hebrew.

The Saint Nicholas Armenian Monastery was built in the 17th century.

Mosques

Al-Bahr Mosque, lit. the Sea Mosque, overlooking the harbour, is depicted in a painting from 1675 by the Dutch painter Cornelis de Bruijn. It may be Jaffa's oldest existing mosque. Built originally in 1675, changes to the structure have been made since then, such as the addition of a second floor and reconstruction of the upper part of the minaret. It was used by fishermen and sailors frequenting the port, and residents of the surrounding area. According to local legend, the wives of sailors living in Jaffa prayed there for the safe return of their husbands. The mosque was renovated in 1997.

Mahmoudia Mosque was built in 1812 by Abu Nabbut, governor of Jaffa from 1810 to 1820. Outside the mosque is a water fountain (sabil) for pilgrims.

Nouzha Mosque on Jerusalem Boulevard is Jaffa's main mosque today.

Archaeology

The majority of excavations in Jaffa are salvage in nature and are conducted by the Israel Antiquities Authority since the 1990s. Excavations on Rabbi Pinchas Street, for example, in the flea market have revealed walls and water conduits dating to the Iron Age, Hellenistic, Early Islamic, Crusader and Ottoman periods. A limestone slab engraved with a menorah discovered on Tanchum Street is believed to be the door of a tomb.

Additional efforts to conduct research excavations at that site included those of B. J. Isserlin (1950), Ze'ev Herzog of Tel Aviv University (1997–1999), and most recently the Jaffa Cultural Heritage Project (since 2007), directed by Aaron A. Burke (UCLA) and Martin Peilstocker (Johannes Gutenberg University).

In December 2020, archaeologists from the Antiquities Authority (IAA) revealed a 3,800-year-old jar containing the badly preserved remains of a baby dates back to the Middle Bronze Age.

"There's always the interpretation that the jar is almost like a womb, so basically the idea is to return [the] baby back into Mother Earth, or into the symbolic protection of his mother”, said archaeologist Alfredo Mederos Martin.

Researchers also covered the remains of at least two horses and pottery dated to the late Ottoman Empire, 232 seashells, 30 Hellenistic coins, 95 glass vessel fragments from the Roman and Crusader periods 14 fifth-century B.C. rock-carved burials featuring lamps.

Education

Collège des Frères de Jaffa, a French international school, is in Jaffa.

Transportation
Jaffa is served by the Dan Bus Company, which operates buses to various neighborhoods of Tel Aviv and Bat Yam.

The Red Line of the planned Tel Aviv Light Rail will cross Jaffa north to south along Jerusalem Boulevard.

Jaffa Railway Station was the first railway station in the Middle East. It served as the terminus for the Jaffa–Jerusalem railway. The station opened in 1891 and closed in 1948. In 2005–09, the station was restored and converted into an entertainment and leisure venue marketed as "HaTachana", Hebrew for "the station" (see homepage here:).

Tel Aviv HaHagana, Holon Junction, and Holon–Wolfson railway stations, are the stations along the Israel Railways network that are located in the vicinity of Jaffa, along its Eastern boundary.

In popular culture
The Knight Of Jaffa is the second episode of the Doctor Who story The Crusade, set in Palestine during the Third Crusade.

Clash of the Titans is set in ancient Joppa. The 2009 Oscar-nominated film Ajami is set in modern Jaffa.

Notable residents

 Asma Agbarieh (born 1974), Israeli Arab journalist and political activist
 Hanan Al-Agha (1948–2008), Palestinian plastic artist
 Shmuel Yosef Agnon (1888–1970), Nobel Prize-winning author
 Dahn Ben-Amotz (1924–1989), radio broadcaster and author
 Yitzhak Ben-Zvi (1884–1963), historian, Labor Zionist leader, and President of Israel
 Benny Hinn (born 1953), TV evangelist and preacher
 Yosef Eliyahu Chelouche (1870–1934), one of the founders of Tel Aviv; businessman
 Joseph Constant (1892–1969), sculptor and writer
 Ismail al-Faruqi (1921–1986), Palestinian-American philosopher
 Lea Gottlieb (1918–2012), Israeli founder and fashion designer of Gottex
 Ibtisam Mara'ana (born 1975), Arab-Israeli filmmaker and member of the Knesset
 Victor Norris Hamilton (born c. 1919), Palestinian-born American cryptologist
 J. E. Hanauer (1850–1938), author, photographer, and Canon of St George's Church
 Yizhar Harari (1908–1978), Zionist activist and Israeli politician
 Haim Hazan (1937–1994), Israeli basketball player
 Nadia Hilou (1953–2015), Arab-Israeli politician
 Pinhas Hozez (born 1957), Israeli basketball player
 Issa El-Issa (1878–1950), Arab journalist
 Daoud El-Issa (1903–1983), Arab journalist
 Yousef El-Issa (1870–1948), Arab journalist
 Raja El-Issa (1922–2008), Arab journalist
 Michel Loève (1907–1979), probabilist and mathematical statistician
 Haim Ramon (born 1950), Israeli politician
Sasha Roiz (born 1973), Canadian actor
 Yoav Saffar (born 1975), Israeli basketball player
 Yosef Sapir (1902–1972), Israeli politician
 Haim Starkman (born 1944), Israeli basketball player
 Rifaat Turk (born 1954), Arab-Israeli football player and manager, and deputy mayor of Tel Aviv

See also
 Bonaparte Visiting the Plague Victims of Jaffa
 County of Jaffa and Ascalon (under the Crusaders)

References

Bibliography

External links

 Jaffa in 1880, SWP Map 13: IAA, Wikimedia commons Coordinates: East longitude, 34.45; North latitude, 32.3
 
 
 
 
 
 
 
 
  (no plugin needed)
 
Plan of Jaffa, 1:6,000, 1918. Eran Laor Cartographic Collection, The National Library of Israel.

 
Archaeological sites in Israel
Neighborhoods of Tel Aviv
Mediterranean port cities and towns in Israel
Bronze Age sites in Israel
Iron Age sites in Israel
Mixed Israeli communities
Arab Christian communities in Israel
Ioppe
History of Israel by location
Ancient Jewish settlements of Judaea
15th-century BC establishments
Phoenician cities